William Saletan is an American writer for The Bulwark.

Background and education
Saletan, a Jewish native of La Porte, Texas, graduated from Swarthmore College in 1987.

Journalism

Abortion and contraception
Saletan has written extensively about abortion, arguing that it should be legal but should also be avoided, if possible, through the use of contraception. In 2004, he wrote that "the fetus is a distinct human entity deserving of legal consideration." However, he distinguished this from "personhood," which he said might not be conferred until viability. In 2009, he opposed new laws against abortion, claiming that they would lead to "hypocrisy, deceit, interrogations, [and] amateur home surgery." He rejected the proposition that abortion was equivalent to murder, and he concluded that "the person best situated to make the right decision is the pregnant woman." But he also called abortion "the destruction of a developing human being. For that reason, the less we do it, the better."

In later years, Saletan turned his attention to contraception. In 2009, he wrote, "A culture of life requires an ethic of contraception. Birth control isn’t a sin ... It’s a loving, conscientious way to prevent the conception of a child you can’t bear to raise and don’t want to abort." In 2015, he advocated for long-acting reversible contraceptives as a way to reduce the prevalence of abortions. He advised opponents of abortion rights: "You can wait till a woman is unhappily pregnant and then try to thwart her will, or you can work with her before she’s pregnant—when she doesn’t want an abortion any more than you do—to avert that crisis."

Homosexuality and marriage
Saletan has argued that homosexuality is morally equivalent to heterosexuality but that committed sexual relationships are morally preferable to casual sexual relationships. In 2003, he wrote, "I’m a lifestyle conservative and an orientation liberal. The way I see it, stable families are good, homosexuality isn’t a choice, and therefore, gay marriage should be not just permitted but encouraged." In a subsequent article entitled, "It’s the Commitment, Stupid," he advised conservatives to accept same-sex marriage because "if you want family values, the simplest thing to do is to let people form families."

In 2013, Saletan criticized what he described as a double standard. He asserted that some conservatives opposed same-sex marriage on the grounds that same-sex couples could not conceive children together, but that they did not apply that rule to infertile opposite-sex couples. He wrote: "Once you acknowledge that homosexuality is involuntary and immutable, you can start to think about it the way you think about infertility." He concluded that same-sex marriage, like marriage between a man and woman who could not conceive children together, "domesticates sex and affirms the simple values of commitment and mutual responsibility."

In 2014, at a debate hosted by the Fixed Point Foundation, a conservative organization, Saletan presented a case for same-sex marriage.
Later, he summarized his argument in Slate, writing that homosexuality was not harmful and could not be a sin "because it isn’t a choice." He expanded on his critique of procreative ability as a prerequisite for marriage, writing: "We don’t ask infertile straight couples to divorce or break up so they can go have a baby with someone else. We shouldn’t do that to gay couples, either." He also advised conservatives to think of homosexuality not as an orientation toward people of one's own sex but as an orientation toward men or toward women, like heterosexuality. From this point of view, he proposed, homosexuality is a relatively rare circumstance in which "people who are oriented toward women are born female," or "people who are oriented toward men are born male."

Iraq war
In 2002, Saletan wrote that the George W. Bush administration had failed to prove its asserted connections between Iraqi President Saddam Hussein and al-Qaeda. In addition, he expressed concern about "an American policy of trigger-happy pre-emption." But he argued that non-intervention in Iraq's nuclear program was also dangerous. During the United States Senate debate over whether to authorize the use of force in Iraq, Saletan described the authorization as leverage that could pressure the United Nations Security Council to enforce its resolutions against Iraq. He concluded that although he distrusted Bush, he would support the authorization because "I don’t trust the French, Russian, or Chinese governments to do anything to Iraq that interferes with their commercial or political interests."

In 2004, in the wake of revelations that the administration had overstated evidence of Iraq's weapons programs, Saletan criticized Bush for "exaggerations wholly unnecessary to the punishment of Saddam for his noncompliance with U.N. inspections." In 2008, he wrote an article entitled, "How Did I Get Iraq Wrong?" He continued to argue that  because Saddam had been "jerking around the [weapons] inspectors," some kind of military intervention had been required to show that the global community was serious about "an enforceable international system to police WMD." But he conceded that Bush's use of force exceeded that basis for action, writing: "If that was the rationale for going in, why disband the Iraqi army? Remaking Iraq was more than the offense justified and more than we could handle." Saletan concluded that he had erred by entrusting the use of force to an unfit president: "You have to decide whether you trust the administration, not just the idea of the war."

Intelligence studies
In a series initially posted on November 18, 2007 on Slate.com, Saletan assessed the relationship between race and intelligence, specifically the question of whether race is a genetically determining factor in intelligence. He ultimately did not discount the hypothesis that it is, concluding: "When I look at all the data, studies, and arguments, I see a prima facie case for partial genetic influence." 

Counterarguments were subsequently published by Richard Nisbett in The New York Times, Stephen Metcalf in Slate and Malcolm Gladwell in The New Yorker. 

Saletan's fourth entry in his series, entitled "Regrets", acknowledged overlooking ties between one of his primary sources, J. Philippe Rushton, and advocates of white supremacy, saying, "I was negligent in failing to research and report this."

In subsequent articles, Saletan reconsidered this subject and argued against racializing discussions of intelligence. In 2008, he called race, as a category of analysis in medical or other biological studies, "the stone age of genetics." He defined scientific racism as "looking and settling for racial analysis when some other combination of categories—economics, culture, genetics—more accurately fits the data. It’s easy to group people by race and compare averages. But it’s pernicious." In 2012, he wrote that "drawing inferences about anyone based on race, sex, religion, or any other crude category is a lousy substitute for inspecting or interacting with that individual." He criticized the application of stereotypes, calling them "an ignorant person’s weak substitute for knowledge." In 2013, he examined sources of racial prejudice and advised readers to reflect on their biases.

In 2018, when the race-IQ controversy resurfaced, Saletan revisited his 2007 series, dissected his errors, and advised others not to repeat them. He wrote that "using racial data to make genetic arguments isn’t scientific," because "genes are the mechanism under discussion," and "genes flow between populations as they do between families, blurring racial categories and reshuffling human diversity." He defended the study of genetic factors in intelligence but cautioned that extrapolation from genetic to racial comparisons "overextends the science" of intelligence. He concluded that framing the biology of intelligence in racial terms, as opposed to genetic terms, does more harm than good.

Trump candidacy and presidency
In 2015, when Donald Trump emerged as a leading candidate for the Republican presidential nomination, Saletan described him as "a mean, angry, vicious person" and a "remorseless expert in manipulating ... bigotry." In March 2016, Saletan called Trump "a clear and present danger" who had "little regard for human rights or the Constitution." In May 2016, Saletan accused Trump of 10 offenses that in his view rendered the candidate unfit for the presidency, including "banning Muslims," "stereotyping Latinos," "practicing group blame against blacks," "inciting violence," "advocating torture," "rationalizing plunder," and "targeting civilians" in proposed military strikes.

During Trump's presidency, Saletan wrote additional articles accusing Trump of bigotry, collaboration with Russian President Vladimir Putin,
service to other dictators against the United States, and fatal mismanagement of the coronavirus pandemic.

Books
Saletan is the author of Bearing Right: How Conservatives Won the Abortion War, first published in 2003. The book chronicled political battles over abortion from the 1980s to the 2000s, concentrating on parental notification laws and prohibitions on public financing of abortions. According to the introduction: "The people who hold the balance of power in the abortion debate are those who favor tradition, family, and property. The philosophy that has prevailed—in favor of legal abortion, in favor of parents’ authority over their children's abortions, against the spending of tax money for abortions—is their philosophy. People who believe that teenage girls have a right to abortion without parental consent, or that poor women have a right to abortion at public expense, have largely been defeated. Liberals haven't won the struggle for abortion rights. Conservatives have."

References

External links

Articles written by Saletan at Slate.com
 Video discussions involving Saletan on Bloggingheads.tv
 

American columnists
American Jews
Place of birth missing (living people)
Year of birth missing (living people)
Living people
Swarthmore College alumni
Slate (magazine) people